Zachary Rodin Fleishman (born March 17, 1980) is an American professional tennis player.

Personal life
Fleishman was born in Santa Monica, and attended UCLA for one year before turning pro.  He is currently the Chief Operating Officer at Shark Wheel, a company that reinvented the wheel into a sine wave-shaped design.

Tennis career
Fleishman began playing tennis at the age of 8. At the age of 18, he played one season (1998–99) of collegiate tennis at the University of California at Los Angeles (UCLA), at the No. 2 position. That year Fleishman helped UCLA to the No. 1 ranking in the country, and to the final of the National Collegiate Athletics Association championships. In the ITF junior world rankings, he reached No. 18 in singles in 1998. After one year of competing on the collegiate level, Fleishman opted to turn professional in 2000.

He has won seven professional singles titles (and numerous doubles titles) in his career, starting with back-to-back satellite wins in El Salvador on hard court, followed by a win in Honduras on red clay.  Fleishman then won back-to-back titles again, this time in his native California, winning two futures events in Redding and Chico (he also won the doubles title).  Later, he was able to establish himself on the challenger circuit, winning a US$25,000 event in Ecuador on red clay and then a US$50,000 event in Vietnam on hard court.  This propelled his ranking to 11th in the United States and World # 127.  In 2008, Zack added another professional tournament victory to his resume winning the Costa Mesa Tennis Futures.

In his career Fleishman notably defeated Fernando González, David Nalbandian, Vince Spadea, Agustín Calleri, Mardy Fish, Robby Ginepri, Daniel Nestor, Tomáš Berdych, Kei Nishikori, Kevin Anderson, Santiago Giraldo, Yen-Hsun Lu, Denis Istomin, Nicolas Mahut, and Joachim Johansson.

2006
In 2006, Fleishman qualified for his first Grand Slam event: the Australian Open.  He won three qualifying matches and then drew world No. 85 Dick Norman of Belgium. Fleishman rallied from two sets down to force a fifth set.  However, Fleishman was unable to capitalize on his momentum, and lost the fifth set and the match.

2007
In 2007, Fleishman again qualified for the Australian Open.  This time, he defeated World # 26 Agustín Calleri of Argentina in the first round, before falling to Australian Wayne Arthurs in the second round.

The same year, Fleishman won three matches and qualified at Wimbledon, where he faced World No. 10 Tommy Haas.  On July 17, 2007, Fleishman achieved his first victory over a top-ten player, defeating world No. 6 Fernando González, in the first round of the Los Angeles Tennis Center's Countrywide Classic.  He proceeded to beat fellow American Robert Kendrick, in the second round, compiling his first ever back-to-back wins in an Association of Tennis Professionals event.  In the quarterfinals, however, Fleishman fell to the eventual tournament champion Radek Štěpánek.

2008
In September 2008, Fleishman won the USA F23 in California, beating Michael McClune in the finals in three sets. He and McClune partnered to win the doubles in the tournament, dropping only one set along the way.

References

External links
 
 
 
 UCLA bio
 NAB Taste of Tennis Australia

Interviews 
Podcast Interview 

Sponsor Interview
Fleishman # 13 with picture of the 20 Most Memorable moments in Australian Open History. The article does not include his 138 mph serve which was the 4th-fastest serve at the Australian Open in 2007

USPTA Certified Professional Level 1 

Living people
1980 births
American male tennis players
Tennis players from Los Angeles
Tennis players from Santa Monica, California
UCLA Bruins men's tennis players
Jewish American sportspeople
Jewish tennis players
Crossroads School alumni
21st-century American Jews